Mark Coxon Morrison (2 April 1877 – 10 May 1945) was a Scottish international rugby union footballer who captained both Scotland and the British and Irish Lions.

Rugby Union career

Amateur career

Morrison played for Royal HSFP.

He played two games for Leicester, one in 1898 and one in 1902.

Provincial career

Morrison played for Edinburgh District and played in the Inter-City matches against Glasgow District.

International career

He played for Scotland twenty three times between 1896 and 1904, and captained the team fifteen times, a record which stood until the era of Arthur Smith, sixty years later.

He first played for Scotland against Wales in 1896, while a teenager playing for Royal HSFP. He continued to play for Scotland until 1904, and captained them a total of 15 times. With Scotland he won three Home Nations Championship with them in 1901, 1903 and 1904. Two of those Championship victories were Triple Crown wins (1901 and 1903).

He was chosen to captain the British and Irish Lions on the 1903 British Lions tour to South Africa. The Lions lost the Test series 1–0 with two drawn. In 2002 he was inducted into the Scottish Sports Hall of Fame.

Jimmy Sinclair, the Springbok forward described Morrison as "a real roughouse of a man, and a great leader."

Administrative career

He was the 55th President of the Scottish Rugby Union, in post from 1934 to 1935.

Outside of rugby

Mark Coxon Morrison was born to John Morrison (1839-1923) and Jane Begg (1846-1911) in Dalmeny, West Lothian.  He was a farmer by trade.

References

Sources

 Bath, Richard (ed.) The Complete Book of Rugby (Seven Oaks Ltd, 1997 )

External links 

1877 births
1945 deaths
British & Irish Lions rugby union players from Scotland
Edinburgh District (rugby union) players
Leicester Tigers players
People educated at the Royal High School, Edinburgh
Presidents of the Scottish Rugby Union
Royal HSFP players
Rugby union forwards
Rugby union players from Edinburgh
Scotland international rugby union players
Scottish rugby union players